Tukoji Rao IV Puar (17 November 1963 – 19 June 2015) was an Indian politician belonging to the Bharatiya Janata Party (BJP). Mr. Pawar was  member of the Legislative Assembly of Madhya Pradesh.

He was a descendant of the Puar dynasty of the Marathas. His father Krishnajirao III was the last ruler of Dewas (Senior) State which was a '15 Gun Salute' princely state in India. He was the titular Maharaja of Dewas (Senior) State until 1971 when in the 26th amendment to the Constitution of India promulgated in 1971, the Government of India abolished all official symbols of princely India, including titles, privileges, and remuneration (privy purses).

He was the Member of Legislative Assembly from Dewas for six terms from 1990 to 2015. He was inducted in the state cabinet for two terms serving as Minister for Higher Education, Technical Education and later Tourism, Sports and Youth Welfare. 
He was elected as the President of the Board of Governors of The Daly College, Indore in 2004, again in 2005, in 2010 and in 2015. His wife Gayatri Raje Pawar has been representing the assembly seat since his death.

He died in 2015 of brain haemorrhage. Vikram Singh Rao II Puar is his son.

See also
 Maratha Empire
 List of Maratha dynasties and states
 List of Indian princely states
 Shahaji II
 Tukojirao III
 Dewas Senior
 Dewas Junior
 Dhar State
 Hemendra Singh Rao Pawar of Dhar State

References

1963 births
People from Madhya Pradesh
People from Dewas
2015 deaths
Bharatiya Janata Party politicians from Madhya Pradesh
Madhya Pradesh MLAs 1990–1992
Madhya Pradesh MLAs 1993–1998
Madhya Pradesh MLAs 1998–2003
Madhya Pradesh MLAs 2003–2008
Madhya Pradesh MLAs 2008–2013
Madhya Pradesh MLAs 2013–2018
The Daly College Alumni